Serranópolis de Minas is a municipality in the northern region of Minas Gerais, Brazil.  The population in 2020 was 4,809.

Location

The municipality has an area of 553 km².  The elevation is 555 meters.  It became a municipality in 1997.  The postal code (CEP) is 39518-000.
Serranópolis de Minas is part of the statistical microregion of Janaúba.

The municipality contains part of the  Serra Nova State Park, created in 2003.

Economy
The main economic activities are cattle raising (12,000 head in 2006) and farming with a modest production of corn, citrus fruits, bananas, coffee, cotton, and sorghum.  In the urban area there were no financial institutions as of 2006.  There were 60 automobiles, giving a ratio of about one automobile for every 70 inhabitants.  The Gross Domestic Product was R$ 10,494,000.00 (2005) a year, which was mainly generated by services and agriculture.  Health care was provided by 3 public health clinics.  There were no private hospitals as of 2005.

Farm Data for 2006
Producers: 533
Area: 24,855 ha.
Area planted in crops: 1,000 ha. 
Area of natural pasture: 14,600 ha. 
Area of woodland and forest: 7,800 ha. 
Persons occupied related to the producer: 1,145
Salaried workers not related to the producer: 109
Establishments with tractors: 18
Number of tractors: 20

Municipal Human Development Index

Serranópolis de Minas was in the bottom tier of the poorest municipalities in Minas Gerais
MHDI: .655 (2000)
State ranking: 730 out of 853 municipalities as of 2000
National ranking: 3,695 out of 5,138 municipalities as of 2000

See also
List of municipalities in Minas Gerais

References

IBGE

Municipalities in Minas Gerais